Ada Ameh  (15 May 1974 – 17 July 2022) was a Nigerian actress who spent more than two decades in the Nigerian movie industry and was most notable for her character as Anita in the 1996 movie titled Domitilla and as Emu Johnson in the award-winning Nigerian television series titled The Johnsons. Ameh in The Johnsons television series featured alongside other Nollywood actors such as Charles Inojie, Chinedu Ikedieze, and Olumide Oworu.

Early life and education
Ameh, although a native of Idoma in Benue State, she was born and raised in Ajegunle in Lagos State, a south-western geographical part of Nigeria predominantly occupied by the Yoruba-speaking people of Nigeria. Ameh received both primary and secondary education in Lagos State but would eventually quit school at age 14, the same age she gave birth to her daughter.

Career
In 1995, Ameh officially became part of the Nigerian movie industry Nollywood and received her first movie role in 1996, where she played the character Anita in the movie Domitila, which became quite successful. The movie was produced and directed by Zeb Ejiro. Ameh also featured in the Nigerian TV series titled The Johnsons, which also became a successful project that received awards.

Later life
Ameh lost several family members: most recently, her own daughter, whom she gave birth to at age 14. Her daughter died in October 2020. Ameh died after collapsing in Warri on 17 July 2022 at the age of 48.
 She suffered from mental health issues prior to her death. A tribute occasion was held for her by the Actors Guild of Nigeria on 18 August 2022 and she was later buried on 26 August at her hometown in Otukpo, Benue State.

Selected filmography
 Domitila
 Aki na Ukwa (with Osita Iheme & Chinedu Ikedieze)
 Phone Swap (with Wale Ojo, Chika Okpala, Nse Ikpe-Etim & Joke Silva)
 Blood Money
 Atlas
 Òlòtūré (2019)
 Our Husband
 King Of Shitta 
 Ghana Must Go 
 A Million Baby 
 One Good Turn 
 Double Trouble
 My Village People (2021)
 Mighty Mama
 On my honour (2021)
 My Village People (2021)
 Lockdown (2021)
 Mr. & Mrs. Okoli (2021)
 Gone (2021) 
 The Sessions

TV series
 The Johnsons starring Samuel Ajibola, Charles Inojie, Susan Pwajok, Ada Ameh, Chinedu Ikedieze, Olumide Oworu, Kunle Bamtefa, Stephanie Zibili, Gaji Samuel, Daniel Iroegbu, Seun Adebajo.

References

External links

1974 births
2022 deaths
Actresses from Benue State
Yoruba actresses
Nigerian film actresses
Nigerian television actresses
20th-century Nigerian actresses
21st-century Nigerian actresses
People from Benue State